Thomas Tomkins (1743–1816) was an English calligrapher.

Life
He kept for many years a writing school in Foster Lane, London. Tomkins was a friend of Samuel Johnson and Sir Joshua Reynolds, and used to demonstrate how he could draw a perfect circle with the pen; but was ridiculed by Isaac D'Israeli. He died in Sermon Lane, Doctors' Commons, in September 1816. His partner in the writing academy, John Reddall, survived till 17 August 1834.

Works
Among examples from his pen are:

A transcript of the charter granted by Charles II to the Irish Society, containing 150 folio pages; 
ornamental titles to books, particularly Thomas Macklin's Bible (8 vols. 1800–16), James Thomson's The Seasons, and the Houghton Collection of Prints; 
a transcript of Horatio Nelson's letter announcing his victory at the battle of the Nile—this was engraved and published; 
titles to three volumes of manuscript music presented to the king by Thomas Linley the elder; 
honorary freedoms presented to celebrated generals and admirals for their victories (1776–1816)—framed duplicates of these are preserved among the city archives; and 
addresses to their majesties on many public occasions, particularly from the Royal Academy.

Tomkins published: 

 The Beauties of Writing, exemplified in a variety of plain and ornamental penmanship. Designed to excite Emulation in this valuable Art, London, 1777; again London, 1808–9, and 1844.
 Alphabets written for the improvement of youth in Round, Text, and Small Hands, 1779.
 Rays of Genius, collected to enlighten the rising generation, 2 vols., London, 1806.
 Poems on various Subjects; selected to enforce the Practice of Virtue; and with a view to comprise … the Beauties of English Poetry, London, 1807.

References

Notes

Attribution

1743 births
1816 deaths
English calligraphers